KidsCo was an international children's television channel founded and owned by a joint-venture between Corus Entertainment, DIC Entertainment, and Sparrowhawk Media Group in April 2007. By the end of 2007, Sparrowhawk was purchased by media conglomerate NBC Universal, thus giving the company its share in the brand. In June 2008, DiC Entertainment was acquired by Cookie Jar Group, thus also having a stake. In May 2012, Cookie Jar's minority shares in KidsCo were brought by NBCUniversal and Corus, which saw NBCUniversal become majority shareholder with a 51% share while Corus obtained a 43.8% share.

KidsCo was closed down worldwide on early 2014 by its owners, in light of NBCUniversal's acquisition of US children's network Sprout and "growing challenges in the international children's television industry. The network was based in London at the time of its closure.

History 
The first KidsCo networks were launched in Poland, Romania and Turkey on September 7, 2007. The channel also launched in Hungary, and Russia.

On January 1, 2008, KidsCo launched in the Philippines on SkyCable and in the Arab World on Orbit Showtime on March 20, 2008. On the first trimester of 2009 the channel was launched in Portugal on Optimus Clix. The channel become available also on Vodafone Casa TV platform on July 25, 2010.

On November 15, 2009, KidsCo launched in Australia on Foxtel.

In November 2009, Kidsco launched in Greece on Conn-x TV and in Cyprus on CytaVision. In November 2010 KidsCo became carried via Greece's IPTV On Telecoms platform. On May 1, 2010, Kidsco launched in South Africa on TopTV and on DStv on July 12, 2010.

 In 2008 KidsCo suggested that it intended to launch throughout France, Italy, Germany, Belgium, the Netherlands and the United States that year, but this did not transpire. Despite numerous claims of an imminent UK launch since 2007, the channel never had presence in the country because  market conditions mean a launch isn't commercially viable.

On January 8, 2013, KidsCo began broadcasting from Corus Quay in Toronto – a state-of-the-art facility that would broadcast the channel to over 100 territories in 18 languages. A refreshed logo, on-air look and website was also launched.

On April 30, 2013, KidsCo was closed in cable networks in Poland, and on other on May 5.

Citing growing challenges in the international children's television industry, and the addition of the competing USA channel Sprout to NBC's portfolio due to its recent acquisition by Comcast, KidsCo announced that it would shut down in early 2014.

The first KidsCo feed to close was in Europe and Turkey on January 1 (New Year's Day 2014). The main KidsCo feeds in Southeast Asia and Australia closed down soon after on February 13. In VOO, the channel was replaced by Piwi+.

References

Universal Networks International
Television channels and stations established in 2007
Children's television networks
NBCUniversal networks
Former Corus Entertainment networks
Joint ventures
Television channels and stations disestablished in 2014